Unaipon is a surname. Notable people with the surname include: 

David Unaipon (1872–1967), Australian preacher, inventor, and author
James Unaipon ( 1835–1907), Australian preacher